Federal Route 109, or Jalan Sungai Perak Kanan or Jalan Sungai Manik, is a federal road in Perak, Malaysia. It is also a main route to Pasir Salak Historical Complex in Pasir Salak.

The Kilometre Zero of the Federal Route 109 is located at Bota Kanan, at its junction with the Federal Route 5, the main trunk road of the west coast of Peninsular Malaysia.

Features
At most sections, the Federal Route 109 was built under the JKR R5 road standard, with a speed limit of 90 km/h.

List of junctions and town

References

Malaysian Federal Roads